The Cala Galdana Bridge is a steel arch bridge over Algendar Creek on the island of Menorca, Spain. It is the first vehicular bridge constructed in duplex stainless steel.

In 2003 its owner (the Consell Insular de Menorca) decided to replace the existing structurally deficient,   reinforced concrete bridge due to severe corrosion (due to the marine environment) and settlement in one of its supports.

Description
The arches have a triangular cross-section, with a central web. In the central zone (with the arch above the deck) the beams have a central web connected to the web of the arch, allowing transfer of the vertical load of the longitudinal beam to the arch. Two struts (connecting the base of each of the arches and the end of the longitudinal beam) avoid horizontal reaction on the abutments.

The main structure weighs  and is made of duplex stainless steel with a grade of 1.4462, which exhibits a high resistance to corrosion by chlorides. The deck is made of reinforced concrete, connected to a series of transverse beams. 
It was completed at a cost of Є2.6 million.

Construction
Construction was begun by Ferrovial in October 2004 (with demolition of the existing bridge), and completed in early June 2005.

References

External links
 

 

Arch bridges
Steel bridges in Spain